839 Valborg is a mid-sized S-type Eunomian asteroid. Its diameter is about 20 km, its albedo of 0.353 is very high for an asteroid. Its rotation period is 10.366 hours.

References

External links 
 Lightcurve plot of 839 Valborg, Palmer Divide Observatory, B. D. Warner (2005)
 Asteroid Lightcurve Database (LCDB), query form (info )
 Dictionary of Minor Planet Names, Google books
 Asteroids and comets rotation curves, CdR – Observatoire de Genève, Raoul Behrend
 Discovery Circumstances: Numbered Minor Planets (1)-(5000) – Minor Planet Center
 
 

000839
Discoveries by Max Wolf
Named minor planets
000839
19160924